Akatsi North District is one of eighteen districts in Volta Region, Ghana. Originally it was formerly part of the then-larger Akatsi District on 10 March 1989, which was created from the former Anlo District Council, until the northern part of the district was split off to create Akatsi North District on 28 June 2012; under the government by then-president John Atta Mills. thus the remaining part has been renamed as Akatsi South District. The district assembly is located in the southeast part of Volta Region and has Ave Dakpa as its capital town.

Villages
The following is an incomplete list of villages in the Akatsi North District.

Ave-Amule
Atiglime
Ave-Afiadenyingba
Ave-Dakpa
Ave-Dzalele
Avevi
Bame
Ave-Atanve
Ave-Dzadzepe
Dzrekofe
Ave-Kpedome
Etekofe
Fiave
Ave-Kpeduhoe
Kpegbadza
Ave-Posmonu
Ave-Xevi
Ave-Kpedome
Ave-Dzayime
Ave-Havi
Ave-Metsrikasa
Ave-Dzadzefe
Agbondo
Bame
Hanyive
Ave-Dzayime
Avega
Korve
Kortey
Sanyi
Fiave
Worta
Kpota
Adzigo
Kpeta
Adzahokorpe
Kudzagbakorfe

References 

Districts of Volta Region
States and territories established in 2012